Xiju is a station on Line 10 and Line 14 of the Beijing Subway. It opened on December 30, 2012. Line 14 service began on May 5, 2013, and Xiju serves as the eastern terminus of Line 14's western section until December 31, 2021, when the remaining  section of Line 14 from Xiju to Beijing South Railway Station opened that day

Station Layout 
Both the line 10 and line 14 stations have underground island platforms.

Exits 
There are 6 exits, lettered A, B, C, E, F, and G. Exits A, C, E, and F are accessible.

Gallery

References

Railway stations in China opened in 2012
Beijing Subway stations in Fengtai District